Marko Kljajević (born 4 May 2001) is a Montenegrin professional basketball player for Podgorica of the Prva A Liga and the ABA League Second Division.

Early career 
In 2017, Kljajević joined the Mega Bemax youth system. He won the 2018 Junior ABA League with the U19 Mega Bemax team.

Professional career 
Prior to the 2019–20 Serbian League season, Kljajević was added to the roster of Mega's affiliate OKK Beograd. During the season, he averaged 5.3 points and 2.4 rebounds in his 22 appearances. In August 2020, he was promoted to the Mega Soccerbet senior team for the 2020–21 ABA season. On 3 October 2020, he made his Mega and Adriatic League debut in a 84–62 win over Igokea, recording 2 points and 3 rebounds.

On 18 June 2021, Kljajević signed a multi-year contract with Podgorica.

National team career 
Kljajević was a member of the Montenegro under-16 team that won the silver medal at the 2017 FIBA Europe Under-16 Championship in his home country. Over seven tournament games, he averaged 3.0 points, 0.7 rebounds, and 0.6 assists per game. Kljajević was a member of the Montenegro under-17 team at the 2018 FIBA Under-17 Basketball World Cup in Rosario and Santa Fe, Argentina. Over seven tournament games, he averaged 2.9 points and 2.0 rebounds per game. In the same year, Kljajević was a member of the Montenegro under-18 team at the FIBA U18 European Championship in Latvia. He only appeared in a 76–52 loss to Germany, recording 4 points, 2 rebounds, and 2 assists. Also, he was a member of the U18 Montenegro team at the 2019 FIBA U18 European Championship in Volos, Greece. Over six tournament games, he averaged 7.2 points, 3.8 rebounds, and 1.2 assists per game.

References

External links 
 Marko Kljajevic at eurobasket.com
 Marko Kljajevic at aba-liga.com
 Marko Kljajevic at realgm.com

2001 births
Living people
ABA League players
Basketball League of Serbia players
KK Mega Basket players
KK Podgorica players
OKK Beograd players
Montenegrin expatriate basketball people in Serbia
Montenegrin men's basketball players
People from Bijelo Polje